The 2014 Omloop van het Hageland was the tenth running of the women's Omloop van het Hageland, a women's bicycle race in Belgium. It was held on 9 March 2014, over a distance of  around Tielt-Winge. It was rated by the UCI as a 1.2 category race.

Results

References

External links
 

Omloop van het Hageland
Omloop van het Hageland
Omloop van het Hageland